Rodrigo Tapia (born 28 September 1994) is an Argentine footballer who plays for Club Atlético Nueva Chicago on loan from San Lorenzo as a defender.

References

External links

1994 births
Living people
Argentine footballers
Argentine expatriate footballers
Footballers from Buenos Aires
Association football defenders
San Lorenzo de Almagro footballers
Defensa y Justicia footballers
Club Deportivo Palestino footballers
Club Atlético Banfield footballers
Nueva Chicago footballers
Chilean Primera División players
Argentine Primera División players
Primera Nacional players
Expatriate footballers in Chile
Argentine expatriate sportspeople in Chile